Terrance Plummer (born June 20, 1993) is an American gridiron football linebacker for the Orlando Guardians of the XFL. He played college football at the University of Central Florida. He signed as an undrafted free agent with the Washington Redskins in 2015.

Early years
Plummer attended Orange Park High School in Orange Park, Florida, where he played football for coach Danny Green at all three linebacker positions including at the inside position as a senior. He received All-First Coast, all-conference and all-county recognition throughout his high school career. As a senior, he amassed over 110 tackles, five sack, two pass deflections and one forced fumble (two recoveries), helping lead the Raiders to a Class 6A Region I District 1 title and berth in the state regional final round. He was a 2010 nominee for the Florida Class 6A Mr. Football Award and was a member of the 2010 Florida Times Union All-First Coast Team, as well as an honorable mention FHSAA all-state in 2009. During his high school career, he led his team in tackling for three-straight seasons and also had eight touchdowns rushing. Plummer also lettered three years in basketball at Orange Park. He had a bench press of 350 pounds.

Viewed as a versatile linebacker prospect, Plummer was given a three-star rating from Rivals, ESPN and Scout. He was listed as the No. 70 outside linebacker nationally by ESPN.com and No. 84 from Scout.com. He picked the Knights over Arkansas, NC State, Vanderbilt and Cincinnati, among others.

Professional career

Pre-draft

Washington Redskins
After going undrafted in the 2015 NFL Draft, Plummer was signed by the Washington Redskins on May 2, 2015. He put together a solid preseason as a middle linebacker and special teams contributor for the Redskins, finishing third on the team with 12 total tackles. On September 5, 2015, he was waived during final roster cuts before the start of the regular season, but signed to the team's practice squad the next day. Plummer was promoted to the active roster on September 19, 2015. Plummer played in three games, recording 1 special teams tackle, but was released October 5, 2015.

Minnesota Vikings
On October 27, 2015, the Minnesota Vikings signed Plummer to the practice squad. On December 1, 2015, he was released from practice squad. On December 8, 2015, Plummer was re-signed to the Vikings practice squad. On January 11, 2016, Plummer signed a reserve/future contract to the Minnesota Vikings. He was released on April 13, 2016. Then added again by the Minnesota Vikings on August 1, 2016. On August 30, 2016, Plummer was cut by the Vikings.

Toronto Argonauts
On October 17, 2016, Plummer signed a practice roster agreement with the Toronto Argonauts of the Canadian Football League. On November 30, 2016, Plummer re-signed with the Argonauts, and made the roster in 2017 as a reserve linebacker. During the playoffs, Plummer recorded an interception, which he returned for a touchdown to help Toronto win the CFL East finals and advance to the 105th Grey Cup, in which the Argos defeated the Calgary Stampeders. He became a free agent on February 25, 2019, two weeks after he had received a contract extension from Toronto.

Orlando Apollos
Plummer was signed to a contract from the rights list of the Orlando Apollos of the Alliance of American Football (AAF) on April 1, 2019, the day before the league suspended operations.

Hamilton Tiger-Cats
Plummer was signed by the Hamilton Tiger-Cats of the CFL on April 4, 2019, after the AAF suspended football operations. Plummer was than released one month later, prior to the start of training camp.

Tampa Bay Vipers
In October 2019, Plummer was selected by the Tampa Bay Vipers in the open phase of the 2020 XFL Draft. He had his contract terminated when the league suspended operations on April 10, 2020.

Orlando Guardians 
On November 17, 2022, Plummer was drafted by the Orlando Guardians of the XFL.

References

External links
Toronto Argonauts bio
UCF Knights bio
Minnesota Vikings bio
Washington Redskins bio

1993 births
Living people
American football linebackers
Canadian football linebackers
American players of Canadian football
UCF Knights football players
Washington Redskins players
Minnesota Vikings players
Toronto Argonauts players
Orlando Apollos players
Hamilton Tiger-Cats players
Tampa Bay Vipers players
Orlando Guardians players
Players of American football from Florida
People from Orange Park, Florida